Vilmoš Zavarko (born 14 March 1988 in Bečej) is a Serbian 9 pin bowling player who plays for Serbian national team and Italian club KK Neumarkt - Imperial Life since 2019.

Vilmoš Zavarko was the first player to bowled more than 700 pins at a World Championship and is currently considered the best classic bowler in the world. He is a multiple world champion, three times Champions League winner, winner of major tournaments and holder of many records in the 120-throw system. His personal bests are unofficial world records. On February 8, 2020, during the Italian A1 League game against ASKC Passeier I - ITAS Walter, scored 771 in 120 throws. On August 24, 2018, in Sandhausen in the tournament at distance of 200 throws he obtained the result of 1172.

For many years, he is also the leader of the NBC world ranking and NBC Grand Prix.

References

1988 births
Living people
People from Bečej
Serbian nine-pin bowling players